Butler Beach is a census-designated place (CDP) in St. Johns County, Florida, United States. The population was 4,978 at the time of the 2020 United States Census.

History
Butler Beach was established by Frank B. Butler, who had been successful operating a grocery store and became a political activist. The Lincolnville businessman bought land in the area between the Atlantic Ocean and the Matanzas River, and offered beach access to African Americans. It was the only beach open to them between Jacksonville and Daytona Beach.

Geography
Butler Beach is located at  (29.800353, -81.263425).

Demographics

As of the census of 2000, there were 4,436 people, 2,152 households, and 1,385 families residing in the CDP. The racial makeup of the CDP was 97.97% White, 0.29% African American, 0.18% Native American, 0.70% Asian, 0.41% from other races, and 0.45% from two or more races. Hispanic or Latino of any race were 1.49% of the population.

There were 2,152 households, out of which 13.6% had children under the age of 18 living with them, 57.8% were married couples living together, 4.8% had a female householder with no husband present, and 35.6% were non-families. 28.0% of all households were made up of individuals, and 12.7% had someone living alone who was 65 years of age or older.  The average household size was 2.06 and the average family size was 2.47.

In the CDP, the population was spread out, with 12.1% under the age of 18, 4.3% from 18 to 24, 19.6% from 25 to 44, 34.4% from 45 to 64, and 29.6% who were 65 years of age or older.  The median age was 54 years. For every 100 females, there were 94.8 males.  For every 100 females age 18 and over, there were 93.4 males.

The median income for a household in the CDP was $46,319, and the median income for a family was $61,850. Males had a median income of $36,875 versus $31,399 for females. The per capita income for the CDP was $31,193.  About 4.2% of families and 6.3% of the population were below the poverty line, including 10.2% of those under age 18 and 3.6% of those age 65 or over.

Education
It is in the St. Johns County School District.

Zoned schools include W. D. Hartley Elementary School, Gamble Rogers Middle School, and Pedro Menendez High School.

References

Census-designated places in St. Johns County, Florida
Census-designated places in the Jacksonville metropolitan area
Census-designated places in Florida
Populated coastal places in Florida on the Atlantic Ocean
Beaches of St. Johns County, Florida
Beaches of Florida
African-American resorts